A list of films produced in Turkey in the 1990s:

1990s

References

External links
 Turkish films at the Internet Movie Database

1990s
Lists of 1990s films
Films